Carex hookeri is a tussock-forming species of perennial sedge in the family Cyperaceae. It is native to western parts of South America.

See also
List of Carex species

References

hookeri
Plants described in 1837
Taxa named by Carl Sigismund Kunth
Flora of Chile
Flora of Ecuador
Flora of Peru